M'tendere Makalamba (born 2 April 1966) is a former Malawian light-middleweight boxer. He competed at the 1988 Summer Olympics, where he finished in seventeenth place. He also represented Malawi at the 1990 Commonwealth Games, losing his opening bout to Michael Bell of New Zealand in the middleweight category.

1988 Olympic results
Below is the record of M'tendere Makalamba, a Malawian light middleweight boxer who competed at the 1988 Seoul Olympics:

 Round of 64: bye
 Round of 32: lost to Roy Jones Jr. (United States) by first-round knockout

References

1966 births
Living people
Malawian male boxers
Olympic boxers of Malawi
Boxers at the 1988 Summer Olympics
Commonwealth Games competitors for Malawi
Boxers at the 1990 Commonwealth Games
Light-middleweight boxers
Middleweight boxers